"Hard as a Rock" is a song and a single by the Australian hard rock band AC/DC. It features as the first track on their album, Ballbreaker, released in 1995. It became their second No. 1 song on the Album Rock Tracks chart, following 1993's "Big Gun". Live performances are also included on three of AC/DC's live concert DVDs, No Bull (of which an audio version is found on the Australian tour edition of Stiff Upper Lip), Stiff Upper Lip Live and Live at the Circus Krone, which is featured in the Deluxe Edition of the 2009 boxset Backtracks. A live version recorded during the band's Stiff Upper Lip World Tour in 2001 at the Stade de France in Paris appears on the 2007 Plug Me In three-disc DVD. It is also featured on the 2012 film Battleship, along with "Thunderstruck".

Music video
The music video to this song was directed by David Mallet, and was set at the Bray Studios in Windsor, Berkshire. Many fans gathered to be a part of this video, and can be seen in front of the stage, and also seen behind the bars which surrounds the stage the band plays on. Also, in the video, lead guitarist Angus Young is seen playing his Gibson SG on a wrecking ball, which destroys a building. Angus Young had stated in the documentary that he had a fear of heights when doing this before. The video can be seen on the 2000 DVD version of No Bull (which also includes the documentary on how the video was made) and the Backtracks box set.

Track listings
CD single
 "Hard as a Rock" – 4:30
 "Caught with Your Pants Down" – 4:14

7-inch single
 "Hard as a Rock" (LP version) – 4:30
 "Caught with Your Pants Down" (LP version) – 4:14

Personnel
Brian Johnson – lead vocals
Angus Young – lead guitar
Malcolm Young – rhythm guitar, backing vocals
Cliff Williams – bass guitar, backing vocals
Phil Rudd – drums, percussion

Charts

References

External links 
Hard as a Rock Song Lyrics
Hard as a Rock Guitar Tabs

AC/DC songs
1995 singles
Number-one singles in Finland
Songs written by Angus Young
Songs written by Malcolm Young
Song recordings produced by Rick Rubin
Music videos directed by David Mallet (director)